"Sorry for Party Rocking" is a song by American duo LMFAO from their second studio album of the same name. It was released as the fourth and final single from the album on January 17, 2012, and was the group's last before their announcement of an indefinite hiatus in September 2012. The song was written and produced by Redfoo and Erin Beck.

Music video

Background
In an interview with the Irish channel TG4, Redfoo stated that they are working on the video for the song. Before this song was released as a single, Redfoo also said that "Sorry for Party Rocking" was a crowd favorite. The official video was uploaded to VEVO on February 21, 2012. The video was directed by Mickey Finnegan and is the prequel to "Party Rock Anthem".

Synopsis
The video begins when an old man named Rufus is complaining to his wife, Agnes, that LMFAO and the Party Rock Crew are partying too much next door of their house, as Rufus and Agnes are getting ready for bed for the night. Rufus decides to go over next door to tell them to stop. Rufus scolds RedFoo and the Party Rock Crew, and when he asks them to explain about their behavior, RedFoo and the Party Rock Crew reply to Rufus with the title song and later continue dancing as Rufus immediately calls the police.

At the beginning of the song, the police start driving through the city in cardboard cars. It later shows SkyBlu driving through the city with Chelsea Korka and the other women. The video returns to RedFoo and the Party Rock Crew still partying in the 'Party Rock' house. The police and several other people across the city later get invited into the 'Party Rock' house and also start partying. Rufus then goes again into the Party Rock Crew's residence to stop them. However, when he sees Agnes join the crowd to party, Rufus angrily leaves. As the party continues, RedFoo gets drunk, rushed to the hospital, and accidentally drops his iPhone. A man wearing a turtle-backpack eventually finds RedFoo's iPhone, connects it with his headphone, and begins shuffling to "Party Rock Anthem". According to the opening caption of "Party Rock Anthem", it is revealed that RedFoo and SkyBlu slipped into comas due to excessive party rocking. The video ends with RedFoo and SkyBlu in the deserted hospital, where "Party Rock Anthem" will begin.

Track listing
"Sorry for Party Rocking" (album version) – 3:24
"Sorry for Party Rocking" (D'anconia Remix) – 3:31
"Sorry for Party Rocking" (Gigi Barocco Remix) – 4:39
"Sorry for Party Rocking" (Nash & Slicox Remix) – 5:04
"Sorry for Party Rocking" (R3hab Remix) – 5:12
"Sorry for Party Rocking" (Ricky Luna Remix) – 5:08
"Sorry for Party Rocking" (Wolfgang Gartner Remix) – 5:37

Cover versions
In 2013, Welsh post-hardcore band The Blackout recorded a cover version as a bonus track on their fourth studio album Start the Party. Comedy rapper Rucka Rucka Ali released a parody, "I'm a Dirty Iraqi", on his 2012 album Rucka's World.

Credits and personnel
Lead vocals – LMFAO
Producers – Redfoo
Lyrics – Stefan Kendal Gordy, Skyler Austen Gordy, Erin Beck
Label: Interscope

Charts and certifications

Weekly charts

Year-end charts

Certifications

References

External links
LMFAO on Myspace

LMFAO songs
2011 songs
2012 singles
Interscope Records singles
Songs written by Sky Blu (rapper)
Songs written by Redfoo
Songs written by Erin Beck
Songs about parties